You Deserve It is an American game show created by Dick de Rijk for American Broadcasting Company (ABC). The show is hosted by Chris Harrison and Brooke Burns. In the show, contestants earn money toward a beneficiary.

Format
The contestant plays for a beneficiary, who is put on surveillance throughout the show and told of the winnings at the end.

He or she plays five rounds which involve identifying a "Who", "What" or "Where" subject based on a series of clues. The player is given the subject's category and one free clue. An additional 9 clues are hidden on the board; clues are revealed in a predetermined order, and get progressively easier. The bank for each round is divided into nine increasing values, hidden behind the numbers 1 through 9. To purchase a clue, the player chooses a numbered card. The amount is revealed and subtracted from the bank, then the clue is revealed. A player can guess the subject at any time, but they only get one guess. A correct guess adds the remaining money in the bank to the contestant's total winnings; if the guess is incorrect, no money is banked for that round. In the first four rounds, the incorrect guess will force the contestant to replay the round for the same maximum amount as the previous round that they got the incorrect answer on (this reduces the top prize); likewise, an incorrect guess on round 5 will result in the total winnings for the beneficiary being cut in half.

Format Changes
On June 23, 2013, the format was Round 5 changed and the $30,000 round was removed which had previously been worth is now round 5, the game's most valuable round. The new round 4 is now worth A new rule was also introduced, making a wrong answer much more costly. Previously, a wrong answer only meant that the contestant would take $0 from that round and could then continue with the next, more valuable round. The current rule is explained above in the "Format" section. A smaller screen to the right of the main screen provides the contestant with the numbers with hidden amounts (the costs for the next clue) behind them.

Prize breakdown
A total of 5 rounds are played in each game, with a possible grand total winnings of either $260,000

Critical reception
Brian Lowry of Variety thought that the show's rules were a "hodgepodge" and criticized Burns' co-hosting, but praised ABC for creating another "uplifting" series. Kevin McDonough of South Coast Today was less positive, saying that "The show doesn't so much celebrate generosity as reduce it to something unspeakably tacky." Tom Conroy of Media Life thought that the show's format was "novel but not involving".

International versions

Links
 ABC Sets Date for 'You Deserve It' Game Show
 Official Website (via Internet Archive)

References

2010s American game shows
2011 American television series debuts
2011 American television series endings
American Broadcasting Company original programming
English-language television shows